Ubiquitin-like 1-activating enzyme E1B (UBLE1B) also known as SUMO-activating enzyme subunit 2 (SAE2) is an enzyme that in humans is encoded by the UBA2 gene.

Posttranslational modification of proteins by the addition of the small protein SUMO (see SUMO1), or sumoylation, regulates protein structure and intracellular localization. SAE1 and UBA2 form a heterodimer that functions as a SUMO-activating enzyme for the sumoylation of proteins.

Structure

DNA
The UBA2 cDNA fragment 2683 bp long and encodes a peptide of 640 amino acids. The predicted protein sequence is more analogous to yeast UBA2 (35% identity) than human UBA3 or E1 (in ubiquitin pathway). The UBA gene is located on chromosome 19.

Protein
Uba2 subunit is 640 aa residues long with a molecular weight of 72 kDa. It consists of three domains: an adenylation domain (containing adenylation active site), a catalytic Cys domain (containing the catalytic Cys173 residue participated in thioester bond formation), and a ubiquitin-like domain.
SUMO-1 binds on Uba2 between the catalytic Cys domain and UbL domain.

Mechanism 

SUMO activating enzyme (E1, heterodimer of SAE1 and UBA2) catalyzes the reaction of activating SUMO-1 and transferring it to Ubc9 (the only known E2 for SUMOylation). The reaction happens in three steps: adenylation, thioester bond formation, and SUMO transfer to E2. First, the carboxyl group of SUMO C-terminal glycine residue attacks ATP, forming SUMO-AMP and pyrophosphate. Next, the thiol group of a catalytic cysteine in the UBA2 active site attacks SUMO-AMP, forming a high energy thioester bond between UBA2 and the C-terminal glycine of SUMO and releasing AMP. Finally, SUMO is transferred to an E2 cysteine, forming another thioester bond.

Function 
Ubiquitin tag has a well understood role of directing protein towards degradation by proteasome. The role SUMO molecules play are more complicated and much less well understood. SUMOylation consequences include altering substrate affinity for other proteins or with DNA, changing substrate localization, and blocking ubiquitin binding (which prevents substrate degradation). For some proteins, SUMOylation doesn’t seem to have a function.

NF-kB 
Transcription factor NF-kB in unstimulated cells is inactivated by IkBa inhibitor protein binding. The activation of NF-kB is achieved by ubiquitination and subsequent degradation of IkBa. SUMOylation of IkBa has a strong inhibitory effect on NF-kB-dependent transcription. This may be a mechanism for cell to regulate the number of NF-kB available for transcriptional activation.

p53 
Transcription factor p53 is a tumor suppressor acting by activating genes involved in cell cycle regulation and apoptosis. Its level is regulated by mdm2-dependent ubiquitination. SUMOylation of p53 (at a distinct lysine residue from ubiquitin modification sites) prevents proteasome degradation and acts as an additional regulator to p53 response.

Expression and regulation 
Studies of yeast budding and fission have revealed that SUMOylation may be important in cell cycle regulation. 
During a cell cycle, the UBA2 concentration doesn't undergo substantial change while SAE1 level shows dramatic fluctuation, suggesting regulation of SAE1 expression rather than UBA2 might be a way for cell to regulate SUMOylation. However, at time points when SAE1 levels are low, little evidence of UBA2-containing protein complexes are found other than SAE1-UBA2 heterodimer. One possible explanation would be that these complexes exist only for a short period of time, thus not obvious in cell extracts. UBA2 expression is found in most organs including the brain, lung and heart, indicating probable existence of SUMOylation pathway in these organs. An elevated level of UBA2 (as well as all other enzyme components of the pathway) is found in testis, suggesting possible role for UBA2 in meiosis or spermatogenesis. Inside the nucleus, UBA2 is distributed throughout nuclei but not found in nucleoli, suggesting SUMOylation may occur primarily in nuclei. Cytoplasmic existence of SAE 1 and UBA2 is also possible and is responsible for conjugation of cytoplasmic substrates.

Model organisms

Mouse 
				
Model organisms have been used in the study of UBA2 function. A conditional knockout mouse line, called Uba2tm1a(KOMP)Wtsi was generated as part of the International Knockout Mouse Consortium program — a high-throughput mutagenesis project to generate and distribute animal models of disease to interested scientists — at the Wellcome Trust Sanger Institute.

Male and female animals underwent a standardized phenotypic screen to determine the effects of deletion.  Twenty five tests were carried out on mutant mice and four significant abnormalities were observed. No homozygous mutant embryos were identified during gestation, and therefore none survived until weaning. The remaining tests were carried out on heterozygous mutant adult mice. Females were found to have a decreased body length by DEXA, while animals of both sex had a decreased number of lumbar and sacral vertebrae in X-rays.

Drosophila 
The coding region of drosophila UBA2 homologue dUBA2 gene is 2.3 kb long and contains 2 introns (53 and 52 bp). The predicted protein has 766 amino acid residues and weighs 84 kDa. The protein has an overall identity of 47% to hUBA2 and 31% to yeast UBA2. There are also several regions of complete identity between the three homologous proteins. The C-terminal region of the coding sequence also contains a putative nuclear localization sequence.

Interactions 
SAE2 has been shown to interact with
 SAE1,
 Small ubiquitin-related modifier 1, and
 UBE2I.

References

Further reading

External links 
 
 

EC 6.3.2
Genes mutated in mice